The 1926 Miami Redskins football team was an American football team that represented Miami University as a member of the Buckeye Athletic Association (BAA) and the Ohio Athletic Conference (OAC) during the 1926 college football season. In its third season under head coach Chester Pittser, Miami compiled a 5–2–1 record (1–2–1 against conference opponents) and finished in fourth place out of six teams in the BAA.

Schedule

References

Miami
Miami
Miami RedHawks football seasons
Miami Redskins football